Antoine Sonrel (died 1879) was an illustrator, engraver, and photographer in Switzerland and Boston, Massachusetts, in the 19th century. He moved from Neuchâtel to the United States around the late 1840s, and was affiliated with Louis Agassiz throughout his career. As a photographer he created numerous carte de visite portraits in the 1860s and 1870s; subjects included his friend Agassiz, Oliver Wendell Holmes, Sr., Oliver Wendell Holmes, Jr., Abbott Lawrence Rotch, and sculptor Anne Whitney.

Biography

Around the 1830s in Neuchâtel, Sonrel began creating scientific illustrations for Louis Agassiz. "Draftsmen of superior talent, trained ... to the greatest accuracy — Weber, Dinkel, and Sonrel — were constantly in [Agassiz's] employ at a regular salary. ... At the suggestion of Agassiz an extensive lithographic establishment was created in Neuchatel." Agassiz wrote in 1857: "I esteem myself happy to have been able to secure the continued assistance of my old friend, Mr. A. Sonrel, in drawing the zoological figures of my work. More than twenty years ago, he began to make illustrations for my European works ; and ever since he has been engaged, with short interruptions, in executing drawings for me."

In the United States, Sonrel lived in Boston on Acorn Street in Beacon Hill (c. 1850), Tremont Street (c. 1873), and in Woburn, Massachusetts (c. 1852–1874). He kept a studio in Boston at 46 School Street (c. 1860s) and Washington Street (c. 1871–1874). Sonrel exhibited lithographs in the 1851 World's Fair in London and in the 1853 exhibition of the Massachusetts Charitable Mechanic Association.

Notes

References

Further reading

Works illustrated by Sonrel
 
 
  ("Elegantly illustrated" with images by Cabot and Sonrel. "The Landscape Illustrations are taken from sketches made on the spot, by Mr. Cabot. Those of the Second Part were drawn and lithographed by Mr. Sonrel, a Swiss artist of much distinction in this branch, and formerly employed by Prof. Agassiz at Neuchatel, but now resident in this country.") 
 Boston Journal of Natural History, 1850s.

About Sonrel

Image gallery
Works by Sonrel

External links

 
  
  Cambridge Historical Society, Massachusetts
 Flickr. Portrait of unidentified child by Sonrel
 Flickr. Portrait of Agassiz by Sonrel

Swiss photographers
American lithographers
Scientific illustrators
Year of birth missing
1879 deaths
Photographers from Massachusetts
Artists from Boston
Swiss emigrants to the United States
19th century in Boston
19th-century American photographers
People from Beacon Hill, Boston
People from Woburn, Massachusetts